Senecio is a very large genus of flowering plants in the sunflower family (Asteraceae). The following species are accepted by The Plant List.

A

Senecio abadianus DC.
Senecio abbreviatus S.Moore
Senecio aberrans Greenm.
Senecio abrotanifolius Gouan
Senecio abruptus Thunb.
Senecio acanthifolius Hombr. & Jacquinot ex Decne.
Senecio acarinus Cabrera
Senecio acaulis (L.f.) Sch.Bip.
Senecio acetosaefolius Baker
Senecio acetosifolius Baker
Senecio achalensis Cabrera
Senecio achilleifolius DC.
Senecio acroleucus Merxm.
Senecio actinella Greene
Senecio actinotus Hand.-Mazz.
Senecio acutangulus (Bertol.) Hemsl.
Senecio acutifolius DC.
Senecio acutipinnus Hand.-Mazz.
Senecio adamantinus Bong.
Senecio adenodontus DC.
Senecio adenophyllus Meyen & Walp.
Senecio adenotrichius DC.
Senecio adglacialis Cuatrec.
Senecio adnatus DC.
Senecio adrianicus Cabrera
Senecio adscendens Bojer ex DC.
Senecio aegyptius L.
Senecio aequinoctialis R.E.Fr.
Senecio affinis DC.
Senecio alatipes Greenm.
Senecio albanensis DC.
Senecio albaniae H.Beltrán
Senecio albanopsis Hilliard
Senecio alberti-smithii Cuatrec.
Senecio albicaulis Hook. & Arn.
Senecio albifolius DC.
Senecio albo-lutescens Sch.Bip.
Senecio albo-punctatus Bolus
Senecio albogilvus I.Thomps.
Senecio albonervius Greenm.
Senecio albopurpureus Kitam.
Senecio albus J.N.Nakaj. & A.M.Teles
Senecio alcicornis Hook. & Arn.
Senecio algens Wedd.
Senecio alienus B.L.Rob. & Seaton
Senecio alleizettei (Humbert) Humbert
Senecio alliariifolius O.Hoffm.
Senecio alloeophyllus O.Hoffm.
Senecio almasensis Mattf.
Senecio almeidae Phil.
Senecio almorzaderonis Cuatrec.
Senecio alniphilus Cabrera
Senecio aloides DC.
Senecio altimontanus A.M.Teles & L.D.Meireles
Senecio altoandinus Cabrera
Senecio alvarezensis Greenm.
Senecio ambatensis Cabrera
Senecio ambraceus Turcz. ex DC.
Senecio ambrosioides Mart. ex Baker
Senecio ameghinoi Speg.
Senecio amplectens A.Gray
Senecio amplificatus C.Jeffrey
Senecio amplifolius (DC.) Hemsl.
Senecio ampullaceus Hook.
Senecio amygdalifolius F.Muell.
Senecio analogus DC.
Senecio anapetes C.Jeffrey
Senecio ancashinus Cabrera
Senecio anconquijae Cabrera
Senecio andersonii Hook.f.
Senecio andinus H.Buek
Senecio andrieuxii DC.
Senecio anethifolius A.Cunn. ex DC.
Senecio angulatus L.f.
Senecio angulifolius DC.
Senecio angustifolius (Thunb.) Willd.
Senecio angustissimus Phil.
Senecio anomalochrous Hilliard
Senecio anonymus A.Wood.
Senecio antandroi Scott-Elliot
Senecio anthemidiphyllus J.Rémy
Senecio anthemifolius Harv.
Senecio antofagastanus Cabrera
Senecio antucensis Phil.
Senecio apensis Cabrera
Senecio aphanactis Greene
Senecio apolobambensis Cabrera
Senecio appendiculatus L.f.
Senecio aquifoliaceus DC.
Senecio aquilaris Cabrera
Senecio aquilonaris Schischk.
Senecio arabidifolius O.Hoffm.
Senecio arachnanthus Franch.
Senecio arechavaletae Baker
Senecio arenarius Thunb.
Senecio argenteus Kuntze
Senecio argillosus Baker
Senecio argophylloides Griseb.
Senecio argutus Kunth
Senecio argyreus Phil.
Senecio aridus Greenm.
Senecio aristeguietae Cuatrec.
Senecio aristianus J.Rémy
Senecio arizonicus Greene
Senecio arleguianus J.Rémy
Senecio armentalis L.O.Williams
Senecio arniciflorus DC.
Senecio arnicoides Hook. & Arn.
Senecio arnottii Hook.f.
Senecio aronicoides DC.
Senecio articulatus (L.f.) Sch.Bip.
Senecio aschenbornianus S.Schauer
Senecio asirensis Boulos & J.R.I.Wood
Senecio aspelina DC.
Senecio aspericaulis J.Rémy
Senecio asperifolius Franch.
Senecio asperulus DC.
Senecio asplenifolius Griseb.
Senecio astephanus Greene
Senecio atacamensis Phil.
Senecio atratus Greene
Senecio atrofuscus Grierson
Senecio attenuatus Sch.Bip. ex Rusby
Senecio aurantiacus Less.
Senecio aureus Georgi
Senecio auritifolius Cabrera
Senecio austin-smithii Standl.
Senecio australandinus Cabrera
Senecio australis Willd.
Senecio austromontanus Hilliard
Senecio ayapatensis Sch.Bip. ex Wedd.

B

Senecio baccharidifolius DC.
Senecio bahioides Hook. & Arn.
Senecio balensis S.Ortiz & Vivero
Senecio balsamicus Phil.
Senecio bampsianus Lisowski
Senecio bangii Rusby
Senecio banksii Hook.f.
Senecio barba-johannis DC.
Senecio barbarae Cabrera
Senecio barbatus DC.
Senecio barbertonicus Klatt
Senecio barkhausioides Turcz.
Senecio barkleyi B.L.Turner
Senecio baronii Humbert
Senecio barorum Humbert
Senecio barrosianus Cabrera
Senecio bartlettii Greenm.
Senecio basalticus Hilliard
Senecio bathurstianus (DC.) Sch.Bip.
Senecio baurii Oliv.
Senecio bayonnensis Boiss.
Senecio beaufilsii Kuntze
Senecio behnii Ricardi & Marticor.
Senecio behrianus Sond. & F.Muell. ex Sond.
Senecio bejucosus Cuatrec.
Senecio belbeysius Delile
Senecio belenensis Griseb.
Senecio belgaumensis (Wight) C.B.Clarke
Senecio bellis Harv.
Senecio benaventianus J.Rémy
Senecio bergii Hieron.
Senecio bigelovii A.Gray
Senecio biligulatus W.W.Sm.
Senecio billieturneri T.M.Barkley
Senecio bipinnatisectus Belcher
Senecio bipinnatus (Thunb.) Less.
Senecio bipontinii Wedd.
Senecio biserratus Belcher
Senecio blanchei Soldano
Senecio blochmanae Greene
Senecio boelckei Cabrera
Senecio bolanderi A.Gray
Senecio boliviensis Sch.Bip. ex Klatt
Senecio bollei Sunding & G.Kunkel
Senecio bomanii R.E.Fr.
Senecio bombayensis N.P.Balakr.
Senecio bombycopholis Bullock
Senecio bonariensis Hook. & Arn.
Senecio bonplandianus DC.
Senecio botijae C.Ehrh.
Senecio brachyantherus (Hiern) S.Moore
Senecio brachycodon Baker
Senecio brachylobus Phil.
Senecio brachypodus DC.
Senecio bracteatus Klatt
Senecio bracteolatus Hook. & Arn.
Senecio brasiliensis (Spreng.) Less.
Senecio brassii Belcher
Senecio bravensis Cabrera
Senecio brenesii Greenm. & Standl.
Senecio brevidentatus M.D.Hend.
Senecio breviflorus (Kadereit) Greuter
Senecio brevilorus Hilliard
Senecio breviscapus DC.
Senecio brevitubulus I.Thomps.
Senecio bridgesii Hook. & Arn.
Senecio brigalowensis I.Thomps.
Senecio brittonianus Hieron.
Senecio brunonianus Hook. & Arn.
Senecio bryoniifolius Harv.
Senecio bugalagrandis Cuatrec.
Senecio buglossus Phil.
Senecio buimalia Buch.-Ham. ex D.Don
Senecio bulbinifolius DC.
Senecio bulleyanus Diels
Senecio bupleuroides DC.
Senecio burchellii DC.
Senecio burkartii Cabrera
Senecio burtonii Hook.f.
Senecio bustillosianus J.Rémy
Senecio byrnensis Hilliard

C

Senecio cacaliaster Lam.
Senecio cachinalensis Phil.
Senecio cajonensis Cabrera
Senecio cakilefolius DC.
Senecio calcensis Cabrera & Zardini
Senecio calchaquinus Cabrera
Senecio calianus Cuatrec.
Senecio californicus DC.
Senecio calingastensis Tombesi
Senecio callosus Sch.Bip.
Senecio calocephalus C.C.Chang
Senecio caloneotes Hilliard
Senecio calyculatus Greenm.
Senecio campylocarpus I.Thomps.
Senecio canadensis L.
Senecio canaliculatus DC.
Senecio canalipes DC.
Senecio cancellatus (Rud.) P. DC.
Senecio canchahuinganquensis Cabrera
Senecio candelariae Benth.
Senecio candidans DC.
Senecio candolleanus Wall. ex DC.
Senecio candollii Wedd.
Senecio cannabinifolius Hook. & Arn.
Senecio cantensis Cabrera
Senecio caparaoensis Cabrera
Senecio cappa Buch.-Ham. ex D.Don
Senecio carbonelli S.Díaz
Senecio carbonensis "C.Ezcurra, M.Ferreyra & S.Clayton"
Senecio cardaminifolius DC.
Senecio carnerensis Greenm.
Senecio carnosulus (Kirk) C.J.Webb
Senecio carnosus Thunb.
Senecio carpetanus Boiss. & Reut.
Senecio carroensis DC.
Senecio caryophyllus Mattf.
Senecio castanaefolius DC.
Senecio catamarcensis Cabrera
Senecio catharinensis Dusén ex Cabrera
Senecio cathcartensis O.Hoffm.
Senecio caucasica DC.
Senecio caudatus DC.
Senecio cedrosensis Greene
Senecio ceratophylloides Griseb.
Senecio ceratophyllus Nees
Senecio cerberoanus J.Rémy
Senecio cervariifolius Sch.Bip.
Senecio chalureaui Humbert
Senecio chamomillifolius Phil.
Senecio chanaralensis Phil.
Senecio chapalensis S.Watson
Senecio chiapensis Hemsl.
Senecio chicharrensis Greenm.
Senecio chihuahuensis S.Watson
Senecio chilensis Cabrera
Senecio chillanensis Cabrera
Senecio chionogeton Wedd.
Senecio chionophilus Phil.
Senecio chipauquilensis Troiani & Steibel
Senecio chiquianensis Cabrera
Senecio chiribogae Cabrera
Senecio chirripoensis H.Rob. & Brettell
Senecio chitaganus Cuatrec.
Senecio chodatianus Cuatrec.
Senecio choroensis Cuatrec.
Senecio chrysanthemoides DC.
Senecio chrysanthemum Dusén
Senecio chrysocoma Meerb.
Senecio chrysocomoides Hook. & Arn.
Senecio chrysolepis Phil.
Senecio chungtienensis C.Jeffrey & Y.L.Chen
Senecio cicatricosus Sch.Bip.
Senecio cinerarioides Kunth
Senecio cinerascens Aiton
Senecio cinerifolius H.Lév.
Senecio cirsiifolius (Hook. & Arn.) Sch.Bip.
Senecio cisplatinus Cabrera
Senecio citriceps Hilliard & B.L.Burtt
Senecio citriformis G.D.Rowley
Senecio clarioneifolius J.Rémy
Senecio clarkianus A.Gray
Senecio claryae B.L.Turner
Senecio claussenii Decne.
Senecio clivicola Wedd.
Senecio clivicolus Wedd.
Senecio coahuilensis Greenm.
Senecio cobanensis J.M.Coult.
Senecio coccineus Klatt
Senecio cochabambensis Cabrera
Senecio cochlearifolius DC.
Senecio cocuyanus (Cuatrec.) Cuatrec.
Senecio colaminus Cuatrec.
Senecio coleophyllus Turcz.
Senecio collinus DC.
Senecio colpodes Bong.
Senecio colu-huapiensis Speg.
Senecio comberi Cabrera
Senecio comosus Sch.Bip.
Senecio condimentarius Cabrera
Senecio condylus I.Thomps.
Senecio conferruminatus I.Thomps.
Senecio confertus Sch.Bip. ex A.Rich.
Senecio confusus Burtt
Senecio congestus (R. Br.) DC.
Senecio conrathii N.E.Br.
Senecio consanguineus DC.
Senecio conyzaefolius Baker
Senecio conyzifolius Baker
Senecio conzattii Greenm.
Senecio copeyensis Greenm.
Senecio coquimbensis Phil.
Senecio corcovadensis Cabrera
Senecio cordifolius L.f.
Senecio coriaceisquamus C.C.Chang
Senecio cornu-cervi MacOwan
Senecio coronatus (Thunb.) Harv.
Senecio coronopifolius Burm.f.
Senecio coronopodiphyllus J.Rémy
Senecio corymbifer DC.
Senecio corymbosus Wall. ex DC.
Senecio coscayanus Ricardi & Marticor.
Senecio costaricensis R.M.King
Senecio cotyledonis DC.
Senecio covasii Cabrera
Senecio covuncensis Cabrera
Senecio coymolachensis Cabrera
Senecio crassiflorus (Poir.) DC.
Senecio crassissimus Humbert
Senecio crassiusculus DC.
Senecio crassorhizus De Wild.
Senecio crassulaefolius (DC.) Sch.Bip.
Senecio crassulus A.Gray
Senecio cremeiflorus Mattf.
Senecio cremnicola Cabrera
Senecio cremnophilus I.M.Johnst.
Senecio crenatus Thunb.
Senecio crenulatus DC.
Senecio crepidifolius DC.
Senecio crepidioides Phil.
Senecio crispatipilosus C.Jeffrey
Senecio crispus Thunb.
Senecio cristimontanus Hilliard
Senecio crithmoides Hook. & Arn.
Senecio cryphiactis O.Hoffm.
Senecio cryptocephalus Cabrera
Senecio cryptolanatus Killick
Senecio ctenophyllus Phil.
Senecio cuchumatanensis L.O.Williams & Ant.Molina
Senecio culciklattii Cuatrec.
Senecio culcitenellus Cuatrec.
Senecio cumingii Hook. & Arn.
Senecio cuneatus Hook.f.
Senecio cuneifolius Gardner
Senecio cunninghamii DC.
Senecio curvatus Baker
Senecio cyaneus O.Hoffm.
Senecio cylindrocephalus Cabrera
Senecio cymosus (ex Gay) J.Rémy

D

Senecio dahuricus Sch.Bip.
Senecio daltonii F.Muell.
Senecio dalzellii C.B.Clarke
Senecio daochengensis Y.L.Chen
Senecio darwinii Hook. & Arn.
Senecio davilae Phil.
Senecio decaryi Humbert
Senecio decurrens DC.
Senecio deferens Griseb.
Senecio deformis Klatt
Senecio delicatulus Cabrera & Zardini
Senecio deltoideus Less.
Senecio densiflorus Wall.
Senecio densiserratus C.C.Chang
Senecio dentato-alatus Mildbr. ex C.Jeffrey
Senecio depauperatus Mattf.
Senecio deppeanus Hemsl.
Senecio depressicola I.Thomps.
Senecio depressus Hook. & Arn.
Senecio descoingsii (Humbert) jacobs. ex G.D.Rowley
Senecio desiderabilis Vell.
Senecio desideratus DC.
Senecio dewildeorum Tjitr.
Senecio diaguita Cabrera
Senecio diaschides D.G.Drury
Senecio dichotomus Phil.
Senecio dichrous (Bong.) Sch.Bip.
Senecio diemii Cabrera
Senecio diffusus L.f.
Senecio digitalifolius DC.
Senecio digitatus Phil.
Senecio dilungensis Lisowski
Senecio dimorphocarpos Colenso
Senecio diodon DC.
Senecio diphyllus De Wild. & Muschl.
Senecio discodregeanus Hilliard & B.L.Burtt
Senecio discokaraguensis C.Jeffrey
Senecio disjectus Wedd.
Senecio dissidens Fourc.
Senecio dissimulans Hilliard
Senecio distalilobatus I.Thomps.
Senecio divaricoides Cabrera
Senecio diversipinnus Ling
Senecio dodrans C.Winkl.
Senecio dolichocephalus I.Thomps.
Senecio dolichodoryius Cuatrec.
Senecio dombeyanus DC.
Senecio domingensis Urb.
Senecio donianus Hook. & Arn.
Senecio doratophyllus Benth.
Senecio doria K.Koch
Senecio doronicum (L.) L.
Senecio doryphoroides C.Jeffrey
Senecio doryphorus Mattf.
Senecio dregeanus DC.
Senecio drukensis C.Marquand & Airy Shaw
Senecio dryophyllus Meyen & Walp.
Senecio dubitabilis C.Jeffrey & Y.L.Chen
Senecio dumeticolus S.Moore
Senecio dumetorum Gardner
Senecio dumosus Fourc.
Senecio dunedinensis Belcher
Senecio durangensis Greenm.
Senecio duriaei J.Gay

E

Senecio echaetus Y.L.Chen & K.Y.Pan
Senecio edgeworthii Hook.f.
Senecio eenii (S.Moore) Merxm.
Senecio eightsii Hook. & Arn.
Senecio elegans L.
Senecio ellenbeckii O.Hoffm.
Senecio elmeri Piper
Senecio elquiensis Cabrera
Senecio emiliopsis C.Jeffrey
Senecio eminens Compton
Senecio emirnensis DC.
Senecio engleranus O.Hoffm.
Senecio epiphyticus Kuntze
Senecio erechtitioides Baker
Senecio eremicola I.Thomps.
Senecio eremophilus A.Gray
Senecio eriobasis DC.
Senecio eriocarphus Greenm.
Senecio eriophyton J.Rémy
Senecio eriopus Willk.
Senecio erisithalifolius Sch.Bip. ex Baker
Senecio erlangeri O.Hoffm.
Senecio erosus L.f.
Senecio ertterae T.M.Barkley
Senecio erubescens Aiton
Senecio erucifolius L.
Senecio eruciformis J.Rémy
Senecio erysimoides DC.
Senecio erythropappus Bureau & Franch.
Senecio esleri C.J.Webb
Senecio espinosae Cabrera
Senecio euclaensis I.Thomps.
Senecio eudorus DC.
Senecio euryopoides DC.
Senecio evacoides Sch.Bip.
Senecio evelynae Muschl.
Senecio everettii Hemsl.
Senecio exarachnoideus C.Jeffrey
Senecio expansus Wedd.
Senecio exsertus Sch.Bip.
Senecio extensus I.Thomps.
Senecio exuberans R.A.Dyer
Senecio exul Hance

F

Senecio faberi Hemsl. ex Hemsl.
Senecio fabrisii Cabrera
Senecio famatinensis Cabrera
Senecio farinaceus Sch.Bip. ex A.Rich.
Senecio farinifer Hook. & Arn.
Senecio fastigiatus Schwein. ex Elliott
Senecio faugasioides Baker
Senecio ferrugineus (Klatt) Cuatrec.
Senecio ferruglii Cabrera
Senecio filaginoides DC.
Senecio filaris McVaugh
Senecio filifer Franch.
Senecio fistulosus Poepp. ex Less.
Senecio flaccidifolius Wedd.
Senecio flaccidus Less.
Senecio flagellifolius Cabrera
Senecio flammeus Turcz. ex DC.
Senecio flanaganii Phillips
Senecio flavus (Decne.) Sch.Bip.
Senecio foeniculoides Harv.
Senecio folidentatus Cuatrec.
Senecio formosissimus Cuatrec.
Senecio formosoides Cuatrec.
Senecio fragrantissimus Tortosa & Bartoli
Senecio franchetii C.Winkl.
Senecio francisci Phil.
Senecio fremontii Torr. & A.Gray
Senecio fresenii Sch.Bip.
Senecio friesii Cabrera
Senecio fukienensis Ling ex C.Jeffrey & Y.L.Chen
Senecio funckii Sch.Bip.
Senecio furusei Kitam.

G

Senecio gallicus Vill.
Senecio ganganensis Cabrera
Senecio garaventai Cabrera
Senecio garcibarrigae Cuatrec.
Senecio gariepiensis Cron
Senecio garlandii F.Muell. ex Belcher
Senecio gawlerensis M.E.Lawr.
Senecio gayanus DC.
Senecio geifolius Sch.Bip.
Senecio geniculatus Steud.
Senecio gentryi (H.Rob. & Brettell) B.L.Turner & T.M.Barkley
Senecio georgianus DC.
Senecio gerberaefolius Sch.Bip. ex Hemsl.
Senecio gerrardii Harv.
Senecio gertii Zardini
Senecio gibsonii Hook.f.
Senecio giessii Merxm.
Senecio gilbertii Turcz.
Senecio gilliesianus Hieron.
Senecio gilliesii Hook. & Arn.
Senecio glaber Less.
Senecio glaberrimus DC.
Senecio glabratus Hook. & Arn.
Senecio glabrescens (DC.) Sch.Bip.
Senecio glabrifolius DC.
Senecio glandulifer Dematt. & Cristóbal
Senecio glanduloso-lanosus Thell.
Senecio glanduloso-pilosus Volkens & Muschl.
Senecio glastifolius L.f.
Senecio glaucophyllus Cheeseman
Senecio glaucus L.
Senecio glinophyllus (H.Rob. & Brettell) McVaugh
Senecio glomeratus Desf. ex Poir.
Senecio glossanthus (Sond.) Belcher
Senecio glutinarius DC.
Senecio glutinosus Thunb.
Senecio gmelinii Ledeb.
Senecio gnidioides Phil.
Senecio gnoma P.Royen
Senecio goldsacki Phil.
Senecio gossweileri Torre
Senecio gossypinus Baker
Senecio graciellae Cabrera
Senecio graciliflorus (Wall.) DC.
Senecio gramineticola C.Jeffrey
Senecio gramineus Harv.
Senecio grandiflorus Meyen
Senecio grandifolius Less.
Senecio grandis Gardner
Senecio grandjotii Cabrera
Senecio greenmanii (H.Rob. & Brettell) L.O.Williams
Senecio greenwayi C.Jeffrey
Senecio gregatus Hilliard
Senecio gregorianus DC.
Senecio gregorii F.Muell.
Senecio griffithii Hook.f. & Thomson ex C.B.Clarke
Senecio grindeliaefolius DC.
Senecio grisebachii Baker
Senecio grossidens Dusén ex Malme
Senecio guadalajarensis B.L.Rob.
Senecio guascensis Cuatrec.
Senecio guerkei Hieron.
Senecio guerrensis T.M.Barkley
Senecio gunckelii Cabrera
Senecio gunnii (Hook.f.) Belcher
Senecio gymnocaulos Phil.
Senecio gypsicola I.Thomps.

H

Senecio hadiensis Forssk.
Senecio haenkeanus Cuatrec.
Senecio haenkei DC.
Senecio halimifolius L.
Senecio hallianus G.D.Rowley
Senecio halophilus I.Thomps.
Senecio haloragis J.Rémy
Senecio hamamelifolius Kunth
Senecio hamersleyensis I.Thomps.
Senecio hansweberi Cuatrec.
Senecio harleyi D.J.N.Hind
Senecio hartwegii Benth.
Senecio hastatifolius Cabrera
Senecio hastatus L.
Senecio hastifolius Less.
Senecio hatcherianus O.Hoffm.
Senecio hatschbachii Cabrera
Senecio hauwai Sykes
Senecio haworthii (Sweet) Sch.Bip.
Senecio haygarthii M.Taylor ex Hilliard
Senecio hedbergii C.Jeffrey
Senecio hederiformis Cron
Senecio helgae Cabrera
Senecio helianthemoides Wedd.
Senecio helichrysoides F.Muell.
Senecio heliopsis Hilliard & B.L.Burtt
Senecio helminthioides (Sch.Bip.) Hilliard
Senecio helodes Benth.
Senecio hemmendorffii Malme
Senecio hercynicus Herborg
Senecio hermannii B.Nord.
Senecio herreianus Dinter
Senecio herrerae Cabrera
Senecio hesperidum Jahand. & al.
Senecio heteroschizus Baker
Senecio heterotrichius DC.
Senecio hewrensis Hook.f.
Senecio hickenii Hauman
Senecio hieracioides DC.
Senecio hieracium J.Rémy
Senecio hieronymi Griseb.
Senecio hilairianus Cabrera
Senecio hillebrandii Christ
Senecio hintonii (H.Rob. & Brettell) J.Pruski & T.M.Barkley
Senecio hintoniorum B.L.Turner
Senecio hirsutilobus Hilliard
Senecio hirsutulus Phil.
Senecio hirtellus DC.
Senecio hirtifolius DC.
Senecio hirtus Cabrera
Senecio hispidissimus I.Thomps.
Senecio hispidulus A.Rich.
Senecio hjertingii Cabrera
Senecio hochstetteri Sch.Bip. ex A.Rich.
Senecio hoehnei Cabrera
Senecio hoggariensis Batt. & Trab.
Senecio hohenackeri Sch.Bip.
Senecio hoi Dunn
Senecio hollandii Compton
Senecio holubii Hutch. & Burtt Davy
Senecio howeanus Belcher
Senecio hualtaranensis "Petenatti, Ariza & Del Vitto"
Senecio hualtata Bertero ex DC.
Senecio huitrinicus Cabrera
Senecio humbertii C.C.Chang
Senecio humidanus C.Jeffrey
Senecio humifusus (Hook.f.) Cabrera
Senecio hydrophiloides Rydb.
Senecio hydrophilus Nutt.
Senecio hypargyraeus DC.
Senecio hypochoerideus DC.
Senecio hypoleucus F.Muell. ex Benth.
Senecio hypsobates Wedd.

I

Senecio icaensis H.Beltrán & A.Galán
Senecio icoglossoides Arechav.
Senecio ilicifolius L.
Senecio iljinii Schischk.
Senecio illapelinus Phil.
Senecio illinitus Phil.
Senecio immixtus C.Jeffrey
Senecio inaequidens DC.
Senecio incisus Thunb.
Senecio incomptus DC.
Senecio incrassatus Lowe
Senecio infernalis Cabrera
Senecio infimus Cabrera
Senecio infirmus C.Jeffrey
Senecio ingeliensis Hilliard
Senecio inornatus DC.
Senecio integerrimus Nutt.
Senecio integrifolius Hook.
Senecio intermedius Wight
Senecio interpositus I.Thomps.
Senecio intricatus S.Moore
Senecio invalidus C.Jeffrey
Senecio involucratus (Kunth) DC.
Senecio iranicus B.Nord.
Senecio isabelis S.Díaz
Senecio isatideus DC.
Senecio isatidioides Phill. & C. A. Sm.
Senecio isatidoides E.Phillips & C.A.Sm.
Senecio iscoensis Hieron.
Senecio isernii Phil.
Senecio ishcaivilcanus Cuatrec.

J

Senecio jacalensis Greenm.
Senecio jacksonii S.Moore
Senecio jacobeaeformis J.Rémy
Senecio jacobsenii Rowley
Senecio jacuticus Schischk.
Senecio jaffuelii Cabrera
Senecio jaliscana S.Watson
Senecio jarae Phil.
Senecio jeffreyanus Lisowski
Senecio jilesii Cabrera
Senecio jinotegensis Klatt
Senecio jobii Cabrera
Senecio johnstonianus Cabrera
Senecio johnstonii Oliv.
Senecio jorquerae Phil.
Senecio juergensii Mattf.
Senecio jujuyensis Cabrera
Senecio julianus Speg.
Senecio junceus (DC.) Harv.
Senecio jungei Phil.
Senecio juniperinus L.f.
Senecio junodii Hutch. & Burtt Davy
Senecio jurgensenii Hemsl.

K

Senecio kacondensis S.Moore
Senecio kalingenwae Hilliard & B.L.Burtt
Senecio karaguensis O.Hoffm.
Senecio karelinioides C.Winkl.
Senecio karstenii Hieron.
Senecio katangensis O.Hoffm.
Senecio kawakamii Makino
Senecio kayomborum Beentje
Senecio keniensis Baker f.
Senecio keniophytum R.E.Fr.
Senecio kenteicus Grub.
Senecio kerberi Greenm.
Senecio kermadecensis Belcher
Senecio keshua Cabrera
Senecio killipii Cabrera
Senecio kingbishopii Cuatrec.
Senecio kingii Hook.f.
Senecio klattii Greenm.
Senecio kleiniiformis Suess.
Senecio kolenatianus C.A.Mey.
Senecio kongboensis Ludlow
Senecio korshinskyi Krasch.
Senecio kosterae Cabrera
Senecio kotschyanus Boiss.
Senecio krameri Franch. & Sav.
Senecio krapovickasii Cabrera
Senecio krascheninnikovii Schischk.
Senecio kuanshanensis C.I Peng & S.W.Chung
Senecio kuhbieri Cuatrec.
Senecio kuhlmannii Cabrera
Senecio kuluensis S.Moore
Senecio kumaonensis Duthie ex C.Jeffrey & Y.L.Chen
Senecio kundaicus C.E.C.Fisch.
Senecio kundelungensis Lisowski
Senecio kunturinus Cabrera

L

Senecio laceratus (F.Muell.) Belcher
Senecio lacustrinus I.Thomps.
Senecio ladakhensis H.J.Chowdhery, Uniyal, R.Mathur & R.R.Rao
Senecio laetevirens Phil.
Senecio laetus Edgew.
Senecio laevicaulis DC.
Senecio laevigatus Thunb.
Senecio lagascanus DC.
Senecio lageniformis I.Thomps.
Senecio lamarckianus Bullock
Senecio lanatus L.f.
Senecio lanceus Aiton
Senecio lancifer J.R.Drumm.
Senecio landbeckii Phil.
Senecio langei Malme
Senecio lanibracteus I.Thomps.
Senecio lanicaulis Greenm.
Senecio lanifer Mart. ex C.Jeffrey
Senecio lanosissimus Cabrera
Senecio lanuginosus Spreng.
Senecio larahuinensis H.Beltrán & A.Galán
Senecio larecajensis Cabrera
Senecio laricifolius Kunth
Senecio laseguei Hombr. & Jacquinot ex Decne.
Senecio lasiocaulon T.M.Barkley
Senecio lastarrianus J.Rémy
Senecio latecorymbosus Gilli
Senecio laticipes Bruyns
Senecio latiflorus Wedd.
Senecio latifolius DC.
Senecio latissimifolius S.Moore
Senecio laucanus Ricardi & Marticor.
Senecio lautus G.Forst. ex Willd.
Senecio lawalreeanus Lisowski
Senecio lawsonii Gamble
Senecio laxus DC.
Senecio legionensis Lange
Senecio lejolyanus Lisowski
Senecio lelyi Hutch.
Senecio lemmonii A.Gray
Senecio lenensis Schischk.
Senecio leonensis Greenm.
Senecio leontodontis DC.
Senecio leptocarpus DC.
Senecio leptocaulos Phil.
Senecio leptocephalus Mattf.
Senecio leptolobus DC.
Senecio leptophyllus DC.
Senecio leptopterus Mesfin
Senecio leptoschizus Bong.
Senecio lessingianus (Wight & Arn.) C.B.Clarke
Senecio lessingii Harv.
Senecio letouzeyanus Lisowski
Senecio leucadendron Benth. & Hook.f.
Senecio leucanthemifolius Poir.
Senecio leucanthemoides Cuatrec.
Senecio leuceria Cabrera
Senecio leucoglossus F.Muell.
Senecio leucolepis Greenm.
Senecio leucomallus A.Gray
Senecio leucopappus (DC.) Bojer ex Humbert
Senecio leucopeplus Cabrera
Senecio leucophyton Phil.
Senecio leucostachys Baker
Senecio leucus Phil.
Senecio lewallei Lisowski
Senecio lhasaensis Ling ex C.Jeffrey & Y.L.Chen
Senecio liangshanensis C.Jeffrey & Y.L.Chen
Senecio liebmannii Buchinger ex Klatt
Senecio ligularia Hook.f.
Senecio lijiangensis C.Jeffrey & Y.L.Chen
Senecio lilloi Cabrera
Senecio limosus Dusén ex Malme
Senecio linaresensis Soldano
Senecio linariifolius Poepp. ex DC.
Senecio linearifolius A.Rich.
Senecio linearilobus Bong.
Senecio lineatus (L.f.) DC.
Senecio lingianus C.Jeffrey & Y.L.Chen
Senecio linifolius (L.) L.
Senecio lithophilus Greenm.
Senecio lithostaurus Cabrera
Senecio litorosus Fourc.
Senecio littoralis Gaudich.
Senecio littoreus Thunb.
Senecio lividus L.
Senecio loayzanus Cabrera
Senecio lobelioides DC.
Senecio lombokensis J.Kost.
Senecio longicollaris I.Thomps.
Senecio longilinguae Cuatrec.
Senecio longipilus I.Thomps.
Senecio looseri Cabrera
Senecio lopez-guillenii Cabrera
Senecio lopez-mirandae Cabrera
Senecio lopezii Boiss.
Senecio loratifolius Greenm.
Senecio lorentziella Hicken
Senecio lorentzii Griseb.
Senecio lucidus (Sw.) DC.
Senecio ludens C.B.Clarke
Senecio luembensis De Wild. & Muschl.
Senecio lugens Richardson
Senecio luridus Phil.
Senecio luzoniensis Merr.
Senecio lycopodioides Schltr.
Senecio lydenburgensis Hutch. & Burtt Davy
Senecio lyonii A.Gray
Senecio lyratus Forssk.

M

Senecio mabberleyi C.Jeffrey
Senecio macedonicus Griseb.
Senecio macowanii Hilliard
Senecio macranthus A.Rich.
Senecio macrocarpus F.Muell. ex Belcher
Senecio macrocephalus DC.
Senecio macroglossoides Hilliard
Senecio macroglossus DC.
Senecio macrophyllus "Humb., Bonpl. & Kunth"
Senecio macrospermus DC.
Senecio macrotis Baker
Senecio maculatus Cabrera
Senecio madagascariensis Poir.
Senecio madariagae Phil.
Senecio madrasensis C.Jeffrey
Senecio madrensis A.Gray
Senecio maeviae Cabrera
Senecio magellanicus Hook. & Arn.
Senecio magnificus F.Muell.
Senecio mairetianus DC.
Senecio makinoi C.Winkl.
Senecio malacophyllus Dusén
Senecio malaissei Lisowski
Senecio mandraliscae (Tineo) H.Jacobsen
Senecio manguensis Cabrera & Zardini
Senecio mapuche Cabrera
Senecio maranguensis O.Hoffm.
Senecio margaritae C.Jeffrey
Senecio marginalis Hilliard
Senecio mariettae Muschl.
Senecio maritimus L.f.
Senecio marojejyensis Humbert
Senecio marotiri C.J.Webb
Senecio martinensis Dusén
Senecio martirensis T.M.Barkley
Senecio massaicus (Maire) Maire
Senecio matricariifolius DC.
Senecio mattfeldianus Cabrera
Senecio mattirolii Chiov.
Senecio maulinus Reiche
Senecio mauricei Hilliard & B.L.Burtt
Senecio maydae Merxm.
Senecio mayurii C.E.C.Fisch.
Senecio mbuluzensis Compton
Senecio medley-woodii Hutch.
Senecio megacephalus Nutt.
Senecio megaglossus F.Muell.
Senecio megalanthus Y.L.Chen
Senecio megaoreinus Zardini
Senecio megaphylla Greenm.
Senecio melanocalyx Cuatrec.
Senecio melanolepis DC.
Senecio melanopotamicus Cabrera
Senecio merendonensis Ant.Molina
Senecio mesembryanthemoides Bojer ex DC.
Senecio mesembrynus Cabrera
Senecio mesogrammoides O.Hoffm.
Senecio meyeri-johannis Engl.
Senecio michoacanus (B.L.Rob.) B.L.Turner & T.M.Barkley
Senecio microalatus C.Jeffrey
Senecio microbasis I.Thomps.
Senecio microcephalus Phil.
Senecio micropifolius DC.
Senecio microspermus DC.
Senecio microtis Phil.
Senecio milanjianus S.Moore
Senecio mimetes Hutch. & R.A.Dyer
Senecio minesinus Cuatrec.
Senecio miniauritus Sagást. & M.O.Dillon
Senecio minutifolius Phil.
Senecio miser Hook.f.
Senecio mishmi C.B.Clarke
Senecio mitonis Cuatrec.
Senecio mitophyllus C.Jeffrey
Senecio mlilwanensis Compton
Senecio modestus Wedd.
Senecio mohavensis A.Gray
Senecio mohinorensis Greenm.
Senecio molinae Phil.
Senecio monanthus Diels
Senecio montereyanus S.Watson
Senecio montevidensis (Spreng.) Baker
Senecio monticola DC.
Senecio monttianus J.Rémy
Senecio mooreanus Hutch. & Burtt Davy
Senecio moorei R.E.Fr.
Senecio mooreioides C.Jeffrey
Senecio morotonensis C.Jeffrey
Senecio morrisonensis Hayata
Senecio mucronatus (Thunb.) Willd.
Senecio muirii L.Bolus
Senecio mulgediifolius S.Schauer
Senecio muliensis C.Jeffrey & Y.L.Chen
Senecio multibracteatus Harv.
Senecio multibracteolatus C.Jeffrey & Y.L.Chen
Senecio multicaulis A.Rich.
Senecio multiceps N.P.Balakr.
Senecio multidentatus Sch.Bip. ex Hemsl.
Senecio multiflorus Sch.Bip.
Senecio multilobus C.C.Chang
Senecio multinervis Sch.Bip. ex Klatt
Senecio multivenius Benth.
Senecio munnozii Cabrera
Senecio muricatus Thunb.
Senecio murinus Phil.
Senecio murorum J.Rémy
Senecio murrayanus Wawra
Senecio mustersi Speg.
Senecio myricaefolius (Bojer ex DC.) Humbert
Senecio myriocephalus Sch.Bip. ex A.Rich.
Senecio myriophyllus Phil.

N

Senecio nagensium C.B.Clarke
Senecio nanus Sch.Bip. ex A.Rich.
Senecio napellifolius Schauer
Senecio napifolius MacOwan
Senecio narinyonis Cuatrec.
Senecio natalicola Hilliard
Senecio navugabensis C.Jeffrey
Senecio neaei DC.
Senecio neelgherryanus DC.
Senecio nemiae "A. Bartoli, Tortosa & S.E.Freire"
Senecio nemoralis Dusén
Senecio nemorensis L.
Senecio neobakeri Humbert
Senecio neowebsteri S.F.Blake
Senecio nesomiorum B.L.Turner
Senecio nevadensis Boiss. & Reut.
Senecio ngoyanus Hilliard
Senecio niederleinii Cabrera
Senecio nigrapicus I.Thomps.
Senecio nigrescens Hook. & Arn.
Senecio nigrocinctus Franch.
Senecio nivalis (Kunth) Cuatrec.
Senecio niveoaureus Cuatrec.
Senecio niveoplanus I.Thomps.
Senecio niveus (Thunb.) Willd.
Senecio nodiflorus C.C.Chang
Senecio nordenskjöldii O.Hoffm.
Senecio nubivagus L.O.Williams
Senecio nublensis Soldano
Senecio nudicaulis Buch.-Ham. ex D.Don
Senecio nuraniae Roldugin
Senecio nutans Sch.Bip.

O

Senecio oaxacanus Hemsl.
Senecio obesus Klatt
Senecio obtectus Kuntze
Senecio obtusatus Wall. ex DC.
Senecio ochrocarpus Oliv. & Hiern
Senecio octolepis Griseb.
Senecio octophyllus Sch.Bip. ex Rusby
Senecio odonellii Cabrera
Senecio odontopterus DC.
Senecio odoratus Hornem.
Senecio oederiifolius DC.
Senecio oerstedianus Benth.
Senecio oldfieldii I.Thomps.
Senecio oldhamianus Maxim.
Senecio oleosus Vell.
Senecio olgae Regel & Schmalh.
Senecio oligoleucus Baker
Senecio oligophyllus Baker
Senecio olivaceobracteatus Ricardi & Marticor.
Senecio oophyllus C.Jeffrey
Senecio orarius J.M.Black
Senecio oreinus Cabrera
Senecio oreophyton J.Rémy
Senecio organensis Casar.
Senecio orizabensis Sch.Bip. ex Hemsl.
Senecio ornatus S.Moore
Senecio oryzetorum Diels
Senecio ostenii Mattf.
Senecio otaeguianus Phil.
Senecio othannae M.Bieb.
Senecio othonniflorus DC.
Senecio otites Kunze ex DC.
Senecio otopterus Griseb.
Senecio ovatus Willd.
Senecio ovoideus (Compton) H.Jacobsen
Senecio oxyodontus DC.
Senecio oxyphyllus A.Cunn. ex DC.
Senecio oxyriifolius DC.
Senecio ozolotepecanus B.L.Turner

P

Senecio paarlensis DC.
Senecio pachyphyllos J.Rémy
Senecio pachyrhizus O.Hoffm.
Senecio paludaffinis Hilliard
Senecio pampae Lingelsh.
Senecio pampeanus Cabrera
Senecio panduratus (Thunb.) Less.
Senecio panduriformis Hilliard
Senecio paniculatus P.J.Bergius
Senecio papillaris Sch.Bip.
Senecio papillosus F.Muell.
Senecio pappii Ricardi & Marticor.
Senecio papuanus (Lauterb.) Belcher
Senecio paraguariensis Mattf.
Senecio paramensis Cuatrec.
Senecio paranensis Malme
Senecio parascitus Hilliard
Senecio parentalis Hilliard & B.L.Burtt
Senecio parodii Cabrera
Senecio parryi A.Gray
Senecio parvifolius DC.
Senecio pascoensis Cabrera
Senecio pascuiandinus Cuatrec.
Senecio patagonicus Hook. & Arn.
Senecio pattersonensis Hoover
Senecio pattersonii B.L.Turner
Senecio paucicalyculatus Klatt
Senecio paucidentatus DC.
Senecio pauciflorus Thunb. ex Harv. & Sond.
Senecio pauciflosculosus C.Jeffrey
Senecio paucifolius S.G.Gmel.
Senecio paucijugus Baker
Senecio pauciradiatus Belcher
Senecio paulensis Bong.
Senecio paulsenii O.Hoffm.
Senecio pavonii (Wedd.) Cuatrec.
Senecio pearsonii Hutch.
Senecio pectinatus DC.
Senecio pellucidus DC.
Senecio pelquensis Dusén
Senecio peltophorus Brenan
Senecio pemehuensis Soldano
Senecio penicillatus (Cass.) Sch.Bip.
Senecio penninervius DC.
Senecio pensilis Greenm.
Senecio pentactinus Klatt
Senecio pentaphyllus Phil.
Senecio pentapterus Cabrera
Senecio pentecostus Hiern
Senecio pentlandicus DC.
Senecio peregrinus Griseb.
Senecio perezii Cabrera
Senecio pergamentaceus Baker
Senecio peripotamus C.Jeffrey
Senecio perralderianus Coss.
Senecio perrottetii DC.
Senecio persicifolius L.
Senecio peteroanus Phil.
Senecio petiolaris DC.
Senecio petraeus Boiss. & Reut.
Senecio pfisteri Ricardi & Marticor.
Senecio pflanzii (Perkins) Cuatrec.
Senecio phanerandrus Cufod.
Senecio phelleus I.Thomps.
Senecio philippicus Regel & Körn.
Senecio philippii Sch.Bip. ex Wedd.
Senecio phorodendroides L.O.Williams
Senecio phylicifolius Poepp. ex DC.
Senecio phylloleptus Cuatrec.
Senecio picridioides (Turcz.) M.E.Lawr.
Senecio picridis S.Schauer
Senecio pierotii Miq.
Senecio pillansii Levyns
Senecio pilosicristus I.Thomps.
Senecio pilotus Phil.
Senecio pilquensis H.Buek
Senecio pinacatensis Felger
Senecio pinachensis Cabrera
Senecio pinetorum Hemsl.
Senecio pinguifolius (DC.) Sch.Bip.
Senecio pinifolius Dusén
Senecio pinnatifidus (P.J.Bergius) Less.
Senecio pinnatifolius A.Rich.
Senecio pinnatilobatus Sch.Bip.
Senecio pinnatipartitus Sch.Bip. ex Oliv.
Senecio pinnatisecta DC.
Senecio pinnatus Poir.
Senecio pinnulatus Thunb.
Senecio piptocoma O.Hoffm.
Senecio × pirottae Chiov.
Senecio pissisii Phil.
Senecio planiflorus Kunze ex Cabrera
Senecio plantagineoides C.Jeffrey
Senecio plantagineus DC.
Senecio platanifolius Benth.
Senecio platensis Arechav.
Senecio plattensis (Packera) Nutt.
Senecio platylepis DC.
Senecio platypus Greenm.
Senecio pleianthus (Humbert) Humbert
Senecio pleistocephalus S.Moore
Senecio pleistophyllus C.Jeffrey
Senecio pleniauritus Cuatrec.
Senecio pluricephalus Cabrera
Senecio poeppigii Hook. & Arn.
Senecio pogonias Cabrera
Senecio pohlii Sch.Bip. ex Baker
Senecio polelensis Hilliard
Senecio polyadenus Hedberg
Senecio polyanthemoides Sch.Bip.
Senecio polyanthemus DC.
Senecio polygaloides Phil.
Senecio polyodon DC.
Senecio polyphyllus Kunze ex DC.
Senecio polypodioides Greene
Senecio pongoensis Cuatrec.
Senecio porphyranthus Schischk.
Senecio portalesianus J.Rémy
Senecio portulacoides J.Rémy
Senecio poseideonis Hilliard & B.L.Burtt
Senecio potosianus Klatt
Senecio pottsii Armstr.
Senecio powellii B.L.Turner
Senecio praecox (Cav.) DC.
Senecio praeruptorum Sch.Bip. ex Klatt
Senecio praeteritus Killick
Senecio prenanthifolius Phil.
Senecio prenanthoides A.Rich.
Senecio pricei N.D.Simpson
Senecio primulifolius F.Muell.
Senecio princei Simps.
Senecio prionopterus B.L.Rob. & Greenm.
Senecio procumbens Kunth
Senecio productus I.Thomps.
Senecio promatensis Matzenb.
Senecio propinquus Schischk.
Senecio prostratus Klatt
Senecio proteus J.Rémy
Senecio provincialis (L.) Druce
Senecio prunifolius Wedd.
Senecio pseudalmeidae Cabrera
Senecio pseudaspericaulis Cabrera
Senecio pseuderucoides Cabrera
Senecio pseudoarnica Less.
Senecio pseudoformosus Cuatrec.
Senecio pseudomairei H.Lév.
Senecio pseudoorientalis Schischk.
Senecio pseudopicridis T.M.Barkley
Senecio pseudostigophlebius Cabrera
Senecio pseudosubsessilis C.Jeffrey
Senecio pseudotites Griseb.
Senecio psilocarpus Belcher & Albr.
Senecio psilophyllus I.Thomps.
Senecio pteridophyllus Franch.
Senecio pterophorus DC.
Senecio puberulus DC.
Senecio pubescens Phil.
Senecio pubigerus L.
Senecio puchi Phil.
Senecio puchii Phil.
Senecio pudicus Greene
Senecio pugioniformis Sch.Bip.
Senecio pulcher Hook. & Arn.
Senecio pulicarioides Baker
Senecio pumilus Tortosa & Bartoli
Senecio puna-sessilis Cuatrec.
Senecio punae Cabrera
Senecio purpureus L.
Senecio purtschelleri Engl.
Senecio pusillus Dinter ex Range
Senecio pycnanthus Phil.
Senecio pyramidatus DC.
Senecio pyrenaicus L.
Senecio pyroglossus Kar. & Kir.
Senecio pyrophilus Zoll. & Mor.

Q

Senecio qathlambanus Hilliard
Senecio quadridentatus Labill.
Senecio quartziticolus Humbert
Senecio quaylei T.M.Barkley
Senecio queenslandicus I.Thomps.
Senecio quercetorum Greene
Senecio quinqueligulatus Winkl.
Senecio quinquelobus (Thunb.) DC.
Senecio quinquenervius Sond. ex Sond.

R

Senecio racemosus (M.Bieb.) DC.
Senecio racemulifer Pavlov
Senecio radicans (L.f.) Sch.Bip.
Senecio radiolatus F.Muell.
Senecio ragazzii Chiov.
Senecio ragonesei Cabrera
Senecio rahmeri Phil.
Senecio ramboanus Cabrera
Senecio ramentaceus Baker
Senecio ramosissimus DC.
Senecio ramosus Wall. ex DC.
Senecio randii S.Moore
Senecio raphanifolius Wall. ex DC.
Senecio rapifolius Nutt.
Senecio rauchii Matzenb.
Senecio reclinatus L.f.
Senecio recurvatus Kunth
Senecio reedi Phil.
Senecio regis H.Rob.
Senecio rehmannii Bolus
Senecio reicheanus Cabrera
Senecio reitzianus Cabrera
Senecio renardii C.Winkl.
Senecio renjifoanus Phil.
Senecio repandus Thunb.
Senecio repangae de Lange & B.G.Murray
Senecio repens Stokes
Senecio repollensis Cabrera
Senecio reptans Turcz.
Senecio resectus DC.
Senecio retanensis Cabrera
Senecio reticulatus DC.
Senecio retortus (DC.) Benth.
Senecio retrorsus DC.
Senecio reverdattoi K.Sobol.
Senecio rhabdos C.B.Clarke
Senecio rhammatophyllus Mattf.
Senecio rhizocephalus Turcz.
Senecio rhizomatus Rusby
Senecio rhomboideus Harv.
Senecio rhyacophilus Greenm.
Senecio rhyncholaenus DC.
Senecio ricardii Martic. & Quezada
Senecio richardsonii B.L.Turner
Senecio riddellii Torr. & A.Gray
Senecio rigidus L.
Senecio riograndensis Matzenb.
Senecio riojanus Cabrera
Senecio riomayensis B.L.Turner
Senecio riskindii B.L.Turner & T.M.Barkley
Senecio ritovegana B.L.Turner
Senecio robertiifolius DC.
Senecio robustus Sch.Bip.
Senecio roldana DC.
Senecio romeroi Cuatrec.
Senecio roripifolius Cabrera
Senecio rosei Greenm.
Senecio roseiflorus R.E.Fr.
Senecio roseus Sch.Bip.
Senecio rosmarinifolius L.f.
Senecio rosmarinus Phil.
Senecio rossianus Mattf.
Senecio rothschuhianus Greenm.
Senecio rowleyanus H.Jacobsen
Senecio royleanus DC.
Senecio rubrilacunae Cuatrec.
Senecio rudbeckiaefolius Meyen & Walp.
Senecio rudbeckiifolius Meyen & Walp.
Senecio rufescens DC.
Senecio rufiglandulosus Colenso
Senecio rugegensis Muschl.
Senecio ruiz-lealii Cabrera
Senecio runcinatus Less.
Senecio runcinifolius J.H.Willis
Senecio rutaceus Phil.
Senecio ruthenensis Mazuc & Timb.-Lagr.
Senecio ruwenzoriensis S.Moore
Senecio rzedowskii García-Pérez

S

Senecio sabinjoensis Muschl.
Senecio saboureaui Humbert
Senecio sacramentanus Wooton & Standl.
Senecio sakamaliensis (Humbert) Humbert
Senecio salicifolia Pers.
Senecio salignus DC.
Senecio saltensis Hook. & Arn.
Senecio saluenensis Diels
Senecio salviifolius Sch.Bip.
Senecio sanagastae Cabrera
Senecio sandersii B.L.Turner
Senecio sandersonii Harv.
Senecio sandwithii Cabrera
Senecio sanguisorbae DC.
Senecio saniensis Hilliard & B.L.Burtt
Senecio santanderensis (Cuatrec.) Cuatrec.
Senecio santelicis Phil.
Senecio santiagoensis Kuntze
Senecio saposhnikovii Krasch. & Schipcz.
Senecio sarcoides C.Jeffrey
Senecio sarracenicus L.
Senecio saucensis Cabrera
Senecio × sundersii W.Sauer & E.Beck
Senecio saussureoides Hand.-Mazz.
Senecio saxatilis Wall. ex DC.
Senecio saxicolus Wedd.
Senecio scaberulus (Hook.f.) D.G.Drury
Senecio scabrellus I.Thomps.
Senecio scandens Buch.-Ham. ex D.Don
Senecio scapiflorus (L'Hér.) C.A.Sm.
Senecio scaposus DC.
Senecio schaffneri Sch.Bip. ex Klatt
Senecio schimperi Sch.Bip. ex A.Rich.
Senecio schizotrichus Greenm.
Senecio schoenemannii Phil.
Senecio schreiteri Cabrera
Senecio schultzii Hochst. ex A.Rich.
Senecio schweinfurthii O.Hoffm.
Senecio scitus Hutch. & Burtt Davy
Senecio sclerophyllus Hemsl.
Senecio scoparius Harv.
Senecio scopolii Hoppe & Hornsch.
Senecio scopulorum Poepp.
Senecio scorzonella Greene
Senecio scrobicaria DC.
Senecio sectilis Griseb.
Senecio segethii Phil.
Senecio selloi (Spreng.) DC.
Senecio semiamplexifolius De Wild.
Senecio seminiveus J.M.Wood & M.S.Evans
Senecio sempervivus Sch.Bip.
Senecio sepium Sch.Bip. ex Rusby
Senecio sericeo-nitens Speg.
Senecio sericeus (Kunze) Kuntze
Senecio serpens G.D.Rowley
Senecio serra Hook.
Senecio serranus Zardini
Senecio serraquitchensis Greenm.
Senecio serratifolius (Meyen & Walp.) Cuatrec.
Senecio serratiformis I.Thomps.
Senecio serratuloides DC.
Senecio serrulatus DC.
Senecio serrurioides Turcz.
Senecio sessilifolius (Hook. & Arn.) Hemsl.
Senecio shabensis Lisowski
Senecio sheldonensis A.E.Porsild
Senecio sibiricus C.B.Clarke
Senecio sichotensis Kom.
Senecio silphioides Hieron.
Senecio simplicissimus DC.
Senecio sinapoides Rusby
Senecio sinuatilobus DC.
Senecio sisymbriifolius DC.
Senecio skirrhodon DC.
Senecio skottsbergii Cabrera
Senecio smithii DC.
Senecio smithioides Cabrera
Senecio snowdenii Hutch.
Senecio sociorum Bolus
Senecio socompae Cabrera
Senecio soldanella A.Gray
Senecio sophioides DC.
Senecio sorianoi Cabrera
Senecio sororius C.Jeffrey
Senecio sotikensis S.Moore
Senecio spanomerus I.Thomps.
Senecio spartareus S.Moore
Senecio spartioides Torr. & A.Gray
Senecio spathiphyllus Franch.
Senecio spathulaefolius Turcz.
Senecio spathulatus A.Rich.
Senecio spatulifolius Kellogg
Senecio speciosissimus J.C.Manning & Goldblatt
Senecio speciosus Willd.
Senecio spegazzinii Cabrera
Senecio spelaeicola (Vaniot) Gagnep.
Senecio sphaerocephalus Greene
Senecio spinescens Sch.Bip.
Senecio spinosus DC.
Senecio spiraeifolius Thunb.
Senecio splendens H.Lév. & Vaniot
Senecio spribillei W.A.Weber
Senecio squalidus L.
Senecio squarrosus A.Rich.
Senecio standleyi Greenm.
Senecio stauntonii DC.
Senecio steparius Cabrera
Senecio sterquilinus Ornduff
Senecio steudelii Sch.Bip. ex A.Rich.
Senecio steudelioides Sch.Bip.
Senecio steyermarkii Greenm.
Senecio stigophlebius Baker
Senecio stoechadiformis DC.
Senecio stokesii F.Br.
Senecio striatifolius DC.
Senecio strictifolius Hiern
Senecio suazaensis Cuatrec.
Senecio subalpinus K.Koch
Senecio subarnicoides Cabrera
Senecio subauritus Phil.
Senecio subcanescens (DC.) Compton
Senecio subcoriaceus Schltr.
Senecio subcymosus (H.Rob.) B.L.Turner & T.M.Barkley
Senecio subdentatus (Bunge) Ledeb.
Senecio subdiscoideus Sch.Bip. ex Wedd.
Senecio subfractiflexus C.Jeffrey
Senecio subfrigidus Kom.
Senecio submontanus Hilliard & B.L.Burtt
Senecio subnemoralis Dusén
Senecio subpanduratus O.Hoffm.
Senecio subpubescens Cabrera
Senecio subrubriflorus O.Hoffm.
Senecio subruncinatus (Wedd.) Greenm.
Senecio subsessilis Oliv. & Hiern
Senecio subsinuatus DC.
Senecio subumbellatus Phil.
Senecio suffultus (Greenm.) McVaugh
Senecio sukaczevii Schischk.
Senecio sulcicalyx Baker
Senecio sumarae Deflers
Senecio sumatranus Martelli
Senecio sundtii Phil.
Senecio supremus Cuatrec.
Senecio surculosus MacOwan
Senecio surinamensis Urb.
Senecio sylvaticus L.
Senecio syneilesis Franch. & Sav.
Senecio syringifolius O.Hoffm.

T

Senecio tabulicola Baker
Senecio tacuaremboensis Arechav.
Senecio taitungensis S.S.Ying
Senecio takedanus Kitam.
Senecio talinoides Sch.Bip.
Senecio talquinus Phil.
Senecio tamoides DC.
Senecio tampicanus DC.
Senecio tanacetopsis Hilliard
Senecio tandilensis Cabrera
Senecio tapianus B.L.Turner
Senecio taraxacoides (A.Gray) Greene
Senecio tarijensis Cabrera
Senecio tarokoensis C.I Peng
Senecio tasmanicus I.Thomps.
Senecio tatsiensis Bureau & Franch.
Senecio tauricus Konechn.
Senecio tehuelches (Speg.) Cabrera
Senecio teixeirae Torre
Senecio telekii (Schweinf.) O.Hoffm.
Senecio telmateius Hilliard
Senecio tenellus DC.
Senecio teneriffae Sch.Bip.
Senecio tenuicaulis Sch.Bip. ex Klatt
Senecio tenuiflorus (DC.) Sieber ex Sch.Bip.
Senecio tenuifolius Burm.f.
Senecio tephrosioides Turcz.
Senecio tergolanatus Cuatrec.
Senecio tetrandrus Buch.-Ham. ex DC.
Senecio thamathuensis Hilliard
Senecio thapsoides DC.
Senecio theresiae O.Hoffm.
Senecio thianschanicus Regel & Schmalh.
Senecio thunbergii Harv.
Senecio tibeticus Hook.f.
Senecio tichomirovii Schischk.
Senecio tilcarensis Cabrera
Senecio tinctolobus I.M.Johnst.
Senecio tingoensis Cabrera & Zardini
Senecio tocomarensis Cabrera & Zardini
Senecio toluccanus DC.
Senecio tonii B.L.Turner
Senecio toroanus Cabrera
Senecio torticaulis Merxm.
Senecio tortuosus DC.
Senecio toxotis C.Jeffrey
Senecio trachylaenus Harv.
Senecio trachyphyllus Schltr.
Senecio trafulensis Cabrera
Senecio transiens (Rouy) Jeanm.
Senecio transmarinus S.Moore
Senecio triangularis Hook.
Senecio tricephalus Kuntze
Senecio trichocaulon Baker
Senecio trichochocaulon Baker
Senecio trichocodon Baker
Senecio tricuspidatus Hook. & Arn.
Senecio tricuspis Franch.
Senecio trifidus Hook. & Arn.
Senecio trifurcatus (G.Forst.) Less.
Senecio trifurcifolius Hieron.
Senecio trilobus L.
Senecio triodon Phil.
Senecio triodontiphyllus C.Jeffrey
Senecio tripinnatifidus Reiche
Senecio triplinervius DC.
Senecio triqueter DC.
Senecio tristis Phil.
Senecio troncosii Phil.
Senecio tropaeolifolius MacOwan ex F.Muell.
Senecio tuberculatus Ali
Senecio tuberosus (DC.) Harv.
Senecio tucumanensis Cabrera
Senecio tugelensis J.M.Wood & M.S.Evans
Senecio tweediei Hook. & Arn.
Senecio tysonii MacOwan

U

Senecio ulopterus Thell.
Senecio umbellatus L.
Senecio umbraculifera S.Watson
Senecio umbrosus Waldst. & Kit.
Senecio umgeniensis Thell.
Senecio unionis Sch.Bip. ex A.Rich.
Senecio urophyllus Conrath
Senecio urundensis S.Moore
Senecio usgorensis Cuatrec.
Senecio uspallatensis Hook. & Arn.
Senecio uspantanensis (J.M.Coult.) Greenm.

V

Senecio vaginatus Hook. & Arn.
Senecio vaginifolius Sch.Bip.
Senecio vagus F.Muell.
Senecio valdivianus Phil.
Senecio variabilis Sch.Bip.
Senecio varicosus L.f.
Senecio varvarcensis Cabrera
Senecio vegetus (Wedd.) Cabrera
Senecio velleioides A.Cunn. ex DC.
Senecio venosus Harv.
Senecio ventanensis Cabrera
Senecio venturae T.M.Barkley
Senecio verbascifolius Burm.f.
Senecio veresczaginii Schischk. & Serg.
Senecio vervoorstii Cabrera
Senecio vestitus (Thunb.) P.J.Bergius
Senecio vicinus S.Moore
Senecio viejoanus B.L.Turner
Senecio villifructus Hilliard
Senecio viminalis Bremek.
Senecio violifolius Cabrera
Senecio viravira Hieron.
Senecio viridilacus Cabrera
Senecio viridis Phil.
Senecio viscidulus Compton
Senecio viscosissimus Colla
Senecio viscosus L.
Senecio vitalis N.E.Br.
Senecio vitellinoides Merxm.
Senecio vittarifolius DC.
Senecio volcanicola C.Jeffrey
Senecio volckmannii Phil.
Senecio volutus (Baker) Humbert
Senecio vulcanicus Boiss.
Senecio vulgaris L.

W

Senecio wairauensis Belcher
Senecio walkeri Arn.
Senecio warnockii Shinners
Senecio warrenensis I.Thomps.
Senecio warszewiczii A.Braun & Bouché
Senecio waterbergensis S.Moore
Senecio websteri Hook.f.
Senecio wedglacialis Cuatrec.
Senecio werdermannii Greenm.
Senecio westermanii Dusén
Senecio wightianus DC. ex Wight
Senecio wightii (DC. ex Wight) Benth. ex C.B.Clarke
Senecio windhoekensis Merxm.
Senecio wittebergensis Compton
Senecio wootonii Greene

X

Senecio xenostylus O.Hoffm.
Senecio xerophilus Phil.

Y

Senecio yalae Cabrera
Senecio yauyensis Cabrera
Senecio yegua (Colla) Cabrera
Senecio yungningensis Hand.-Mazz.
Senecio yurensis Rusby

Z

Senecio zapahuirensis Martic. & Quezada
Senecio zapalae Cabrera
Senecio zeylanicus DC.
Senecio zimapanicus Hemsl.
Senecio zoellneri Martic. & Quezada
Senecio zosterifolius Hook. & Arn.

References 

 List
Senecio